Perizoma (from Greek , from peri "around, about" and zoma "loin-cloth, drawers, band, belt") is a type of loincloth that originated with the Minoan civilization in Crete. Surviving depictions show it being worn by male and female acrobats (for example, in the Bull-Leaping Fresco).

A perizoma was possibly worn by Jesus during his crucifixion. It is a standard feature of the crucifixion in the arts. However, Roman custom was to crucify victims naked, and there is no evidence to suggest that Jesus was an exception. Perizoma was likely added by later artists to preserve modesty (see fig leaf) and first appeared in the 8th century. Aachen Cathedral claims to have the actual relic of the perizoma, preserved inside the Marienschrein reliquary.

See also
 Subligaculum
 Kaupinam

References

Undergarments
Roman-era clothing
Greek clothing
Iconography of Jesus
Relics associated with Jesus